Antikuna or Anticona may refer to:

 Ticlio, a mountain in the Lima Region and the Junín Region of Peru
 Antikuna (Jauja), a mountain in the Junín Region of Peru
 Antikuna (god), a sacred Apu in South American mythology
 Antikuna (spider), a genus of tarantulas